Navneet Hindi Digest is a monthly Hindi-language magazine started in January 1952 by Shreegopaal Newatia in Mumbai. His idea was to bring out a magazine in Hindi on the lines of Reader's Digest. The magazine was taken over by the management of Bhartiya Vidya Bhavan in 1980. There has been a change in the name of the magazine also. Now it is published as Bhavan's Navneet.

History
The editors  of the magazine:
Ratan Lal Joshi 1952 to 1960
Satyakam Vidyalankar 1960 to 1967
Narayan Dutt 1967 to 1980
Virendra Kumar Jain 1980 to 1986
Girijashankar Trivedi 1986 to 2004
Kumar Prashant 2004 to 2006
Vishwanath Sachdev 2006 to till date.

Sadu pradesh

External links
 Official website

1952 establishments in Bombay State
Hindi-language magazines
Literary magazines published in India
Monthly magazines published in India
Magazines established in 1952
Mass media in Mumbai